Sankari division is a revenue division in the Salem district of Tamil Nadu, India.

References 
 

Revenue blocks of Salem district